Sleep inversion or sleep-wake inversion is a reversal of sleeping tendencies. Individuals experiencing sleep-wake inversion exchange diurnal habits for nocturnal habits, meaning they are active at night and sleep during the day. Sleep-wake inversion, when involuntary, can be a sign of a serious disorder.

Presentation 
Individuals with the delayed sleep phase type of the disorder exhibit habitually late sleep hours and an inability to change their sleeping schedule consistently. They often show sleepiness during the desired wake period of their days. Their actual phase of sleep is normal. Once they fall asleep, they stay asleep for a normal period of time, albeit a period of time that starts and stops at an abnormally late time.

Causes 
Sleep inversion may be a symptom of elevated blood ammonia levels and is often an early symptom of hepatic encephalopathy. Sleep inversion is a feature of African trypanosomiasis, after which the disease takes its common name, "African sleeping sickness"; sleep-wake cycle disturbances are the most common indication that the disease has reached the stage where infection spreads into the central nervous system.

See also 
Jet lag
Shift work sleep disorder
Circadian rhythm
Delayed sleep phase disorder
Encephalitis lethargica
Lethargy

References

External links
 American Psychiatric Association. Diagnostic and Statistical Manual of Mental Disorders. 4th edition, text revised. Washington, DC: American Psychiatric Association, 2000.
 Buysse, Daniel J., Charles M. Morin, and Charles F. Reynolds III. Sleep Disorders. In Treatments of Psychiatric Disorders, edited by Glen O. Gabbard. 2nd edition. Washington, DC: American Psychiatric Press, 1995.
 Hobson, J. Allan, and Rosalia Silvestri. "Sleep and Its Disorders." In The Harvard Guide to Psychiatry, edited by Armand M. Nicholi, Jr., M.D. Cambridge, MA: Belknap Press of Harvard University Press, 1999.
 Thorpy, Michael J., M.D., and Jan Yager, Ph.D.The Encyclopedia of Sleep and Sleep Disorders. 2nd edition. New York: Facts on File, 2001.
 American Sleep Disorders Association. 6301 Bandel Road NW, Suite 101, Rochester, MN 55901.
 http://www.minddisorders.com/Br-Del/Circadian-rhythm-sleep-disorder.html#ixzz3tkBVLE9P

Sleep medicine
Sleep disorders